Orachrysops brinkmani, the Brinkman's blue, is a butterfly of the family Lycaenidae. It is found in South Africa, where it is known from fynbos in the Western Cape.

The wingspan is 24–38 mm for males and 28–39 mm for females. Adults are on wing from October to November.

The larvae probably feed on Indigofera declinata.

This butterfly was first discovered by Tony Brinkman, currently the custodian of the Classics Faculty and Faculty of Asian and Middle Eastern Studies at the University of Cambridge. Tony can often be found wheeling his trolley around the Sidgwick Site and laying on a spread for events around the year.

References

Butterflies described in 1997
Orachrysops